George Mack (1899-1963) was mainly a museum ornithologist and collector, but also worked as an ichthyologist.  He migrated from Britain to Western Australia in 1919.  He worked at the National Museum of Victoria from 1923 to 1945. During this time, he published a revision of the Australian species of the fairy-wren genus Malurus and described several species of fish, for example Galaxiella pusilla.  He then worked at the Queensland Museum from 1945, rising to become director in 1963, the year of his death.  It was his controversial action in shooting a scarlet robin during the Royal Australasian Ornithologists Union (RAOU) campout in Marlo, Victoria in 1935 that catalysed change in the RAOU's attitude to collecting.

References

Robin, Libby. (2001). The Flight of the Emu: a hundred years of Australian ornithology 1901-2001. Carlton, Vic. Melbourne University Press. 

Australian ornithologists
Australian ichthyologists
1899 births
1963 deaths
20th-century Australian zoologists